Jim Irvin is an English singer, songwriter, music journalist and podcast host.

Early life
Born James Lawrence Irvin and raised in west London.

Career

Furniture
Irvin was the singer in the English new wave band Furniture, who released singles and albums with Survival, Stiff and Arista Records between 1982 and 1990. He co-wrote their 1986 UK hit single, "Brilliant Mind", taken from the album, The Wrong People. The song also appeared in the John Hughes movie, Some Kind of Wonderful and was re-recorded for the soundtrack. Furniture made one further album, Food, Sex & Paranoia, for Arista (1990), and disbanded in 1991. In 1992, Irvin recorded an album, Mad Scared Dumb and Gorgeous  with jazz musician Chris Ingham, under the name Because. It was released on Boo Hewerdine's Haven label.

In 2019, Emotional Rescue records reissued Furniture's debut, six-song mini-album, When the Boom Was On (1983) and an EP of 12" mixes called On Broken Glass

Music journalism
In 1991, Irvin began contributing to Melody Maker magazine, where his work appeared under the name Jim Arundel. He was later made reviews editor. In 1994, reverting to Jim Irvin, he became the founding features editor of Mojo magazine. One of his most notable pieces for the magazine was "Angel of Avalon", a major profile of the late Sandy Denny, published in 1998. He also edited an acclaimed book, The Mojo Collection. He has written for The Word, Time Out, The Sunday Times and The Guardian and continues to write a reissues column for Mojo. 

In February 2015, he published an e-book, A Book Of Wild Flowers, which collected his writings on Sandy Denny, Joni Mitchell and Kate Bush.

In May 2018, he co-authored Jeff Buckley: From Hallelujah To The Last Goodbye (Post Hill Press), a biography of Jeff Buckley written with Dave Lory, the singer's former manager.

In 2020, he launched a podcast, “Here’s One I Made Earlier” where he interviewed musical creators about a significant work in their career. The following year he launched a second podcast “You’re Not On The List” dedicated to “forgotten albums and the people who love them”, in which guests nominate undervalued albums and discuss them.

Later production and songwriting
In 1995, Irvin produced the first demos by the band Gay Dad, and co-write some of the songs which later appeared on their debut album, Leisure Noise. Their single, "Oh Jim", was said to be dedicated to him.

In 1999, he produced Lido, the debut album by Clearlake, released in 2000 on his own label, Dusty Company, an offshoot of Domino Records.

Irvin returned to full-time songwriting in 2001, concentrating initially on dance music. He co-wrote the 2004 hit "The Weekend" by Michael Gray, and had work recorded by Groove Armada, Full Intention and David Guetta.

Since 2006, his work has been mostly outside dance music, with artists like Lana Del Rey, Lissie, Simple Plan, Jack Savoretti, Unloved, Nothing but Thieves and Yungblud.

The song "Love", co-written with and performed by Unloved, introduced the Apple Keynote Speech in March 2019.

Discography

Bibliography

Essays and reporting
 
  Review of five albums by Françoise Hardy.

References

External links
 
 Radius Music

1959 births
Living people
English rock singers
English rock keyboardists
English music journalists
English record producers
English songwriters
English new wave musicians
English house musicians
Male new wave singers
Musicians from London
Mojo (magazine) people